Anders Kühnau Hansen (born 12 August 1981) is a Danish politician and member of the regionsråd (regional parliament) of Mid Jutland.

References

External links
 Anders skal øve sig i at være Bent Hansen, Danmarks Radio, 29 September 2016
 Bent Hansens afløser kørt i stilling, Dagbladet Holstebro-Struer, 28 September 2016
 Ekspert: Det trækker op til et Bent Hansen-farvel i utide, TV2 Østjylland, 22 December 2016
 Bent Hansens kronprins: Jeg ønsker at fortsætte meget af Bents arbejde, Danmarks Radio, 2 January 2017
 Anders Kühnau: Jeg er stolt og klar til opgaven, Jyllands-Posten, 3 January 2017
 Bent Hansen anbefaler ung horsensianer som sin afløser AOIB, 2 January 2017
 Regions-bossen peger på horsensianer som sin oplagte efterfølger, Horsens Folkeblad, 2 January 2017
 Skæbnevalg for Bent H - Hvilken vej vil han gå? Randers Amtsavis, 12 December 2016
 Presentation by Anders Kühnau on FT.dk

1981 births
Living people
21st-century Danish politicians
People from the Central Denmark Region